Cross My Heart is an American romantic comedy that was released in the United States on November 13, 1987. It stars Martin Short and Annette O'Toole.

Plot
Bruce Gaynor (Paul Reiser) advises David Morgan (Short) while Nancy (Joanna Kerns) advises Kathy (O'Toole) on how to go about their third and most intimate date.

Although they have dated twice, they have not revealed their biggest secrets. This third date challenges their relationship as the truths surface.  Both parties find that honesty really is the best policy.

Cast
 Martin Short as David Morgan 
 Annette O'Toole as Kathy 
 Paul Reiser as Bruce Gaynor 
 Joanna Kerns as Nancy 
 Jessica Puscas as Jessica 
 Lee Arenberg as Parking Attendant 
 Corinne Bohrer as Susan 
 Jason Stuart as Waiter 
 Shelley Taylor Morgan as Woman in Restaurant 
 Eric Poppick as Maitre D
 Steven J. Zmed as Fumbling Spa Attendant

Reception
Cross My Heart holds a rating of 46% on Rotten Tomatoes from 13 reviews.

Availability
The film was released on VHS in 1988 by MCA Home Video and contains a trailer for the film Positive I.D. at the end. Universal released the film onto DVD on August 3, 2010.

In June 2022, Mill Creek Entertainment released Cross My Heart on Blu-ray as a single-disc double feature along with the 1991 Martin Short comedy Pure Luck.

References

External links

1987 romantic comedy films
American romantic comedy films
1987 films
Universal Pictures films
Films directed by Armyan Bernstein
1980s English-language films
Films with screenplays by Armyan Bernstein
Films scored by Bruce Broughton
1980s American films